Alexandre Balmer (born 4 May 2000) is a Swiss cross-country and road racing cyclist, who currently rides for UCI WorldTeam . He participated at the 2018 UCI Mountain Bike World Championships, winning a gold medal in the team relay.

Major results

Road

2017
 National Junior Road Championships
1st  Time trial
3rd Road race
2018
 National Junior Road Championships
1st  Time trial
1st  Road race
 1st  Overall Driedaagse van Axel
 2nd  Road race, UEC European Junior Road Championships
 2nd Trofeo Buffoni
 4th Road race, UCI Junior Road World Championships
2019
 5th Time trial, National Under-23 Road Championships
2020
 1st  Time trial, National Under-23 Road Championships
2021
 3rd Giro del Belvedere 
 8th Overall Giro della Valle d'Aosta
 8th Time trial, UEC European Under–23 Road Championships
 9th Overall Alpes Isère Tour
1st  Young rider classification
2022
 9th Maryland Cycling Classic
 9th Giro del Veneto

Mountain Bike
2017
 2nd  Cross-country, UCI European Junior Championships
2018
 UCI World Championships
1st  Team relay
1st  Junior Cross-country
 1st  Cross-country, UCI European Junior Championships
2020
 UCI Under-23 XCO World Cup
2nd Nové Město I
 3rd  Team relay, UCI World Championships

References

External links

2000 births
Living people
Swiss male cyclists
Swiss mountain bikers